A pub bombing or a public house bombing is an attack on a pub or public house using explosives and other bombing making material like nails, bolts, screws and similar objects which can cause horrific injuries when the bomb detonates. The Provisional IRA's Balcombe Street Gang used bolts and screws in many of their bomb attacks in the mid-1970s. Neo-nazi David Copeland used nails in his bombs.

Types

There are several ways of delivering the bomb to its intended target. Some of these methods include, the bombers hide a time bomb in something like a bag or holdall, walk into a pub and blend in with the crowd and draw as little attention to themselves as possible and will place the bomb in an unnoticeable spot, the bombers will usually leave at least 10 minutes before the bomb detonates so they are safe away from the blast and can give themselves time to get away. If the intention was causing harm to people then the bomb is usually laden with shrapnel to cause maximum casualties, if the intention is just to cause destruction then the bombers will usually leave between 45 minutes–1 hour before the bomb detonates so they can give the police a warning so that the building has enough time to be evacuated.

Early Loyalist bombs were quite crude and usually they would involve just lighting a fuse on a bomb, and either opening the door of a pub and simply throwing the bomb in and running away, or leaving the bomb at the front door, or sometimes the side of the building, then light the fuse and run away. Or by building a fragmentation grenade which is small but heavy enough to throw through a public house window, this method was usually favoured by the Balcombe Street Gang who carried out several pub bombings in England in the mid-1970s.

History
The vast majority of pub bombings were carried out during Northern Ireland's "Troubles" conflict. The attacks were carried out by Irish republican and Ulster loyalist paramilitary groups, such as the Republican Provisional IRA (PIRA), Irish National Liberation Army (INLA) and the Loyalist Ulster Volunteer Force UVF and Ulster Freedom Fighters (UFF). There were some pub bombings carried out by other European urban guerrilla movements around the same period.

One of the first pub bombings of the Troubles in Northern Ireland was the PIRA bombing of the Bluebell Bar in the Sandy Row area of Belfast a staunchly loyalist, Protestant area of Belfast. Almost 30 people were injured in this bombing which occurred on the 20 September 1971. A few weeks later the Loyalists carried out their first pub bombing when the UVF bombed what they believed to be a Republican owned pub called the Fiddler's House Bar on the 9 October 1971, to were hoping to hurt Catholics but instead killed a middle aged Protestant women & injured several others.

The worst pub bombing in Northern Ireland happened early on in the conflict. The McGurk's Bar bombing which was carried out by the UVF claimed the lives of 15 civilians and 17 others were badly injured. At the time it was the highest death toll from any attack in the North, until the PIRA's Warrenpoint ambush which killed 18 people in August 1979.

The worst pub bombing in the UK was the Birmingham pub bombings of the 21 November 1974. 21 people were killed and 182 others were injured many of the seriously. It was the PIRA's worst attack of the conflict in terms of civilian deaths and it was the highest death toll from a pub bombing during the conflict.

The worst pub bombing attack in the Republic of Ireland during the conflict was the bombing at Kay's Tavern which occurred in Dundalk in County Louth. Two people were killed in this attack and 20 more injured. The Red Hand Commando (RHC) a UVF link group claimed they carried out the attack, it is believed the UVF linked group carried out the attack.

During the 1970s, loyalists stepped up their bombing campaign against pubs and it was said they were helped allegedly by the security forces, in an alliance of UVF, UDR, UDA, RUC, RUC Special Branch, RUC Special Patrol Group and a small number of British soldiers. Between 1973 and 1977 they bombed a long list of pubs and other places.

Journalist Anne Cadwallader described some of the attacks in the 1974–75 period as being "the height of their campaign" which also included not just bomb attacks but shootings as well, known as "spray jobs" in Northern Ireland. The group these people belonged to was the infamous Glenanne gang.

1 – 17 January 1974: Daniel Hughes was shot dead in a UVF gun attack on Boyle's Bar, Cappagh.
2 – 14 February 1974: The Glenanne Gang attack Traynors bar.
3 – 29 November 1974 – A loyalist bomb explodes at a bar called Hughe's Bar in Newry, fatally injuring John Mallon, and in another bomb attack on McArdles Bar, near Crossmaglen injuring Thomas McNamme who died less than a year later.
4 – 10 February 1975 – The UVF attack Haydebs Bar and they killed Eugene Doyle and Arthur Mullholland.
5 – 27 April 1975 – a loyalist gang attacked Bleary Dart's club and kill three people, Joe Toman, Brendan O'Hara and John Feeney were all killed playing a game of darts.
6 – 4 September 1975 – The UVF attacked McCann's bar near Ballyagan killing Margaret Hale in the attack.
7 – 22 August 1975 – The UVF destroys the "McGleenan's Bar". Many were injured and some lost legs and limbs in the attack, John McGleenan, Patrick Hughes and Thomas Morris were all murdered.
8 – 19 December 1976 – The UVF planted a car bomb outside a pub in Dundalk and it exploded killing 2 people and injured 22 others.
9 – 17 March 1976 – The UVF planted a large car bomb outside a bar called the Hillcrest Bar, on St. Patrick's Day. The UVF car bomb explodes, and killed Andrew Small, Patrick Baranard, Joe Kelly, James McChauey. Many more were injured.
10 – 16 August 1976 – The Step Inn pub in Keady, Armagh is bombed by members of the Glenanne gang, killing Betty McDonald and Gerard McGleenan.

The reason pub bombings were so common during the Troubles was because pubs were a regular place for people to gather socially in Ireland and Britain and they were easy targets to injure or kill a large number of people in one go. In other European countries a cafe or nightclub would have been more of a target for guerrillas rather than a public house.

Notable pub bombings

Pub shootings
Another attack unique to The Troubles in Ireland was paramilitaries shooting customers inside public houses. This tactic was mainly used by the Loyalist paramilitaries during the later stages of the conflict but sometimes Republicans carried them out as well. Usually the shooting would include a 3–4 member active service unit, one member acting as a getaway driver, one as a lookout and two as shooters, usually one of the shooters would use a machine gun or automatic rifle to spray the pub with gunfire, and the other shooter would use a smaller gun like a pistol or revolver to shoot any customer who tried to attack or stop the main shooter.
Some instances of pub shootings include:

See also
 Provisional IRA
 Ulster Volunteer Force
 Ulster Freedom Fighters
 Red Hand Commando
 Irish National Liberation Army
 Irish People's Liberation Organisation
 Time bomb
 Armenian Secret Army for the Liberation of Armenia

Further reading
 Peter Taylor - Provo's: The IRA & Sinn Fein
 Alan F Parkinson - 1972 And The Ulster Troubles
 Aaron Edwards - UVF: Behind The Mask
 Anne Cadwallader - Lethal Allies: British Collusion In Ireland
 Ed Moloney - A Secret History of the IRA A Secret History of the IRA
 Henry McDonald & Jack Holland - INLA - Deadly Divisions
 Henry McDonald & Jim Cusack - UVF: Endgame

References

Car and truck bombings in Europe
Improvised explosive device bombings in the Republic of Ireland
Troubles